The Hand of God is a 2021 Italian drama film written, directed, and produced by Paolo Sorrentino. It stars Filippo Scotti, Toni Servillo, Teresa Saponangelo, Marlon Joubert, Luisa Ranieri, Renato Carpentieri, Massimiliano Gallo, Betti Pedrazzi, Biagio Manna, and Ciro Capano. The film refers autobiographically to Sorrentino's youth in Naples.

It competed for the Golden Lion at the 78th Venice International Film Festival where it won the Grand Jury Prize and where Filippo Scotti received the Marcello Mastroianni Award. It was released in a limited release on 24 November 2021, followed by streaming on Netflix on 15 December 2021. It was nominated for Best International Feature Film at the 94th Academy Awards.

Plot
In the 1980s, young Fabietto lives at home in Naples with his father Saverio Schisa and mother Maria Schisa. He doesn’t have many friends nor a lover and wants to study philosophy in college. For the time being, he's mainly listening to music and watching Diego Maradona play for his home team, Napoli. His brother Marchino takes him to acting auditions and sympathizes with his affection for their emotionally troubled aunt Patrizia. Fabietto’s parents are building a new home in Roccaraso. They visit the home without Fabietto who decides to stay while they go along. His parents die of carbon monoxide coming from the fireplace in the new home. Due to this, Fabietto comes of age in a cruel and brutal manner.

Cast
 Filippo Scotti as Fabietto Schisa
 Toni Servillo as Saverio Schisa
 Teresa Saponangelo as Maria Schisa
 Luisa Ranieri as Patrizia
 Massimiliano Gallo as Franco
 Renato Carpentieri as Alfredo
 Ciro Capano as Antonio Capuano
 Marlon Joubert as Marchino Schisa
 Betti Pedrazzi as Baronessa Focale
 Biagio Manna as Armando
 Enzo De Caro as San Gennaro
 Sofya Gershevich as Yulia
 Roberto Oliveri as Maurizio
 Lino Musella as Mariettiello
 Cristiana Dell'Anna as Armando's sister
 Monica Nappo as Silvana
 Carmen Pommella as Annarella
 Adriano Saleri as Federico Fellini's assistant

Production
In July 2020, it was announced Paolo Sorrentino would write, direct, and produce the film, with Netflix attached to distribute. That same month, a lawyer for Diego Maradona stated he was considering legal action against the film for its title, as it is a reference to Maradona's 1986 FIFA World Cup goal against England, and use of Maradona's image was not authorized. Netflix responded that the film is not a sports film or about Maradona and instead a personal story inspired by Sorrentino's youth. In September 2020, Toni Servillo joined the cast of the film, with principal photography commencing that same month, in Naples, Italy.

Release

The Hand of God had its world premiere at the 78th Venice International Film Festival on 2 September 2021. It became available worldwide on Netflix on 15 December 2021.

Reception

Critical response
On review aggregator Rotten Tomatoes, the film has an approval rating of 83% based on 143 reviews, with an average rating of 7.3/10. The website's critics consensus reads, "Although The Hand of God isn't Sorrentino's best work, this beautifully filmed coming-of-age story sings in a beguiling, albeit minor, key." On Metacritic, the film has a weighted average score of 76 out of 100, based on 36 critics, indicating "generally favorable reviews".

Accolades

See also
 List of submissions to the 94th Academy Awards for Best International Feature Film
 List of Italian submissions for the Academy Award for Best International Feature Film

References

External links
 
 
 
 Official screenplay (English)
 Official screenplay (Italian)

2021 films
2021 drama films
2020s Italian-language films
Italian drama films
Films directed by Paolo Sorrentino
Films set in the 1980s
Films set in Naples
Venice Grand Jury Prize winners
Italian-language Netflix original films
Films with screenplays by Paolo Sorrentino
2020s Italian films